Measure of Revenge (also known in the UK as Leave Not One Alive) is a 2022 American thriller film directed by Peyfa. It stars Bella Thorne, Melissa Leo, Roma Maffia, Jake Weary and Adrian Martinez. Timur Bekbosunov, Jordan Galland wrote the screenplay.
Jen Gatien and Peter Wong produced the film.

Cast
 Bella Thorne as Taz
 Melissa Leo as Lillian
 Roma Maffia as Mona
 Jake Weary as Curtis
 Adrian Martinez as Addison
 Benedict Samuel as Ronin
 Annapurna Sriram as Zoe/Hamlette
 Michael Potts as Detective Eaton
 Jason A. Rodriguez as Stagehand
 Jasmine Carmichael as Olivia
 Ivan Martin as Billy
 Gemma Massot as Lady MacBeth
 Jamie Jackson as The Gardener
 Mod Sun as Lord MacBeth
 Oscar Pavlo as Load Dock Thug
 Booker Garrett as Buttercup
 DL Sams as Actress
 Eliza Gill as Blue Model
 Kevin Corrigan as Claude

Release
Measure of Revenge was released on March 18, 2022, by Vertical Entertainment.

Reception

References

External links
 

2022 films
2020s English-language films
Vertical Entertainment films
2022 thriller films
American thriller films
2020s American films